Gadot is a Hebrew surname meaning riverbanks. Notable people with the name include:

 Gal Gadot (born 1985), Israeli actress and model
 Gideon Gadot (1941–2012), Israeli journalist and politician.

See also
 Godot (disambiguation)

Hebrew-language surnames